The Lindenwold Public Schools are a comprehensive community public school district that serves students in pre-kindergarten through twelfth grade from Lindenwold, in Camden County, New Jersey, United States.

As of the 2018–19 school year, the district, comprising five schools, had an enrollment of 2,845 students and 240.1 classroom teachers (on an FTE basis), for a student–teacher ratio of 11.8:1.

The district is classified by the New Jersey Department of Education as being in District Factor Group "B", the second lowest of eight groupings. District Factor Groups organize districts statewide to allow comparison by common socioeconomic characteristics of the local districts. From lowest socioeconomic status to highest, the categories are A, B, CD, DE, FG, GH, I and J.

Schools
Schools in the district (with 2018–19 enrollment data from the National Center for Education Statistics) are:
Elementary schools
Lindenwold Preschool with 159 students in PreK
Zeke Gadson, Assistant Principal for Preschool 
Lindenwold School 4 with 630 students in grades K-4
Dana Lawrence, Principal
Lindenwold School 5 with 591 students in grades K-4
Sandra Martinez-Preyor, Principal
Middle school
Lindenwold Middle School with 840 students in grades 5-8
Theodore Pugliese, Principal
High school
Lindenwold High School with 543 students in grades 9-12
Peter Brandt, Principal

Administration
Core members of the district's administration are:
Dr. Lori Moore, Superintendent
Kathleen Huder, Business Administrator / Board Secretary

Board of education
The district's board of education, with nine members, sets policy and oversees the fiscal and educational operation of the district through its administration. As a Type II school district, the board's trustees are elected directly by voters to serve three-year terms of office on a staggered basis, with three seats up for election each year held (since 2012) as part of the November general election. The board appoints a superintendent to oversee the day-to-day operation of the district.

References

External links
Lindenwold Public Schools

School Data for the Lindenwold Public Schools, National Center for Education Statistics

Lindenwold, New Jersey
New Jersey District Factor Group B
School districts in Camden County, New Jersey